Stein Erik Hagen (born 22 July 1956) is a Norwegian businessman. He is chairman of Orkla, where he is a major shareholder, and holds large stakes in Steen & Strøm, Jernia and Komplett through his family company Canica. According to the news magazine Kapital, Hagen is worth NOK 24 billion, making him the second richest person in Norway.

Biography
Hagen is educated at Kjøpmannsinsituttet (now part of the BI Norwegian Business School). He founded the RIMI discount store chain along with his father in the 1970s, and retained ownership until the 2000s, when he sold to Swedish ICA and Ahold. Most of the money was ploughed into Orkla. Hagen reportedly owns one of the biggest sailboats in Europe and used to own his own island in the Caribbean.

He provided financial support to the Liberal Party in the 2005 Norwegian election and to the Liberal Party, Christian Democratic Party, Conservative Party and Progress Party in 2006.

Private life 
Stein Erik Hagen has three children from his first marriage, and a son from a later relationship. In 2004 he married Mille-Marie Treschow, the couple announced in 2012 that they were separating.

In October 2015, Hagen came out on the Norwegian-Swedish talk show Skavlan. Later the same day he added that he was bisexual, and that his ex-wives and family have known about his sexuality for many years.

References

1956 births
Living people
Businesspeople from Oslo
20th-century Norwegian businesspeople
21st-century Norwegian businesspeople
BI Norwegian Business School alumni
Norwegian billionaires
Bisexual men
Bisexual businesspeople
Norwegian bisexual people
Norwegian LGBT businesspeople